Masaji Marumoto ( January 27, 1906 – February 10, 1995) was the first Japanese American Justice of the Supreme Court of Hawaii. He served from 1956 to 1973. He was the first Japanese American to graduate from Harvard Law School, and the first Japanese American to serve as president of the Hawaii Bar Association.

Early life and education 

Marumoto was born on January 27, 1906, in Honolulu to immigrants from Hiroshima, Japan. He grew up in Kona, and in seventh grade moved back to Honolulu, where he attended McKinley High School and graduated at the top of his class in 1924.

After graduating from high school he earned a bachelor's degree in economics with a minor in philosophy from the University of Chicago. At first Marumoto wanted to major in philosophy, but his father convinced him to major in something more "practical". In 1927 he became the first Asian to enter Harvard Law School. He graduated in 1930.

Career 
After graduating from law school Marumoto returned to Hawaii and took the Hawaii Bar Exam. He worked at a few law offices in Honolulu before opening his own practice in 1932. In 1933 he married Shizuko Ozu.

After Pearl Harbor was attacked in 1942, Marumoto helped to start the Emergency Services Committee, which worked with law enforcement and civilians to ease tensions between the Japanese-American community and those who thought they were a threat. He also volunteered to join the 442nd, but failed the physical because of his clubfoot, which he was born with. Instead, he taught at the Military Intelligence Service (MIS) language school since he was fluent in Japanese. In May 1945 he was sent to Okinawa to assist with establishing a government there. He was later sent to Korea, and left the military in 1946, after the war ended. In June 1946 he was elected president of the MIS Veterans Club.

He became president of the Hawaii Bar Association in 1954 and was the first Japanese American to serve in that position. In 1956 he was appointed as an associate justice to the Supreme Court of the Territory of Hawaii by President Eisenhower, and remained in that position when Hawaii became a state in 1959. He quit in 1960 and rejoined private practice, but returned to the Supreme Court from 1967 to 1973. He resigned from the court in December 1973 to enable Governor John A. Burns to appoint his successor, with Burns appointing Benjamin Menor to the seat.

Marumoto wrote extensively on the history of Japanese in Hawaii, and received an honorary doctorate for his work from the University of Hawaii at Manoa in 1985. He also received a Second Class Order of the Sacred Treasure from Emperor Hirohito.

Marumoto died on February 10, 1995.

Further reading 

 First among Nisei: the Life and Writings of Masaji Marumoto by Dennis Ogawa

See also
List of Asian American jurists

References

Justices of the Hawaii Supreme Court
University of Chicago alumni
Harvard Law School alumni
1995 deaths
People from Honolulu
1906 births
American jurists of Japanese descent
20th-century American judges